The Stabilisation Unit is a cross-government unit of the UK government, governed through the National Security Council. It aims to support fragile states and countries emerging from conflict, where close cooperation between international agencies, the military, and civilian personnel is essential.

The Stabilisation Unit, formed in 2007 from the Post-Conflict Reconstruction Unit, serves a similar function to and works closely with institutions such as the Stabilization and Reconstruction Task Force (Canada) and the Bureau of Conflict and Stabilization Operations (United States).

Since 2015 the unit has been funded through the Conflict, Stability and Security Fund and governed through the National Security Council. Prior to 2015 it was it is jointly controlled by the FCO, the DFID, and the MOD.

Activities
The Stabilisation Unit's objectives are:
To prevent or contain violent conflict;
To protect people, key assets and institutions
To promote political processes which lead to greater stability.
Prepare for longer-term development and address the causes of conflict.

Locations
The Stabilisation has provided advice, or assistance, for various places in crisis, including:
Afghanistan: The SU has helped with a variety of problems in Helmand province.
Democratic Republic of Congo: A stabilisation advisor has been with MONUC since 2008.
Haiti: Assisting prisons in Haiti after the earthquake
Iraq: The SU assisted the Provincial Reconstruction Team in Basra, and helped rebuild police capabilities.
Sudan: Helping with civil society engagement. Four consultants are in Darfur. 
Kosovo, Moldova, Somalia, Yemen, and Pakistan: The SU helped build strategies for assisting these countries.

People
The SU recruits civil servants into the Civil Service Stabilisation Cadre (CSSC).

The SU also recruits civilians; the UK Civilian Stabilisation Group (CSG) was launched in February 2010. The SU maintains a flexible and diverse pool of civilian experts who can be deployed to assist other countries to help build peace & security.

References

External links
 Stabilisation Unit – United Kingdom

Department for International Development
Foreign, Commonwealth and Development Office
Foreign relations of the United Kingdom
International development agencies
Ministry of Defence (United Kingdom)
2007 establishments in the United Kingdom